Elián Gaspar Larregina (born 20 February 2000) is an Argentine sprinter specialising in the 400 metres. He won a bronze medal at the 2022 Ibero-American Championships setting a new national record of 45.78.

International competitions

Personal bests
Outdoor
100 metres – 10.89 (+0.1 m/s, Rosario 2019)
200 metres – 21.08 (+2.0 m/s, Mar del Plata 2019)
400 metres – 45.53 (Cascavel 2022) NR
Indoor
400 metres – 47.52 (Cochabamba 2020) NR

References

2000 births
Living people
Argentine male sprinters
Sportspeople from Buenos Aires Province